Epigynopteryx glycera is a moth of the  family Geometridae. It is found in Madagascar.

This is a little, elegant species with a wingspan of 31–32 mm with very few irrorations.

Subspecies
Epigynopteryx glycera glycera  Prout, 1934
Epigynopteryx glycera subbasalis  Herbulot, 1965

References

Ennominae
Moths described in 1934
Moths of Madagascar
Moths of Africa